Wages of Conscience is a 1927 American silent drama film directed by John Ince and starring Herbert Rawlinson, Grace Darmond and Margaret Campbell.

Cast
 Herbert Rawlinson as Henry McWade
 Grace Darmond as Lillian Bradley / Mary Knowles
 John Ince as Frank Knowles
 Henri La Garde as Dr. Covington
 Margaret Campbell as Lillian's Aunt
 Jasmine	as	Mifa, the Servant

References

Bibliography
 Connelly, Robert B. The Silents: Silent Feature Films, 1910-36, Volume 40, Issue 2. December Press, 1998.
 Munden, Kenneth White. The American Film Institute Catalog of Motion Pictures Produced in the United States, Part 1. University of California Press, 1997.

External links
 

1927 films
1927 drama films
1920s English-language films
American silent feature films
Silent American drama films
Films directed by John Ince
American black-and-white films
1920s American films